Smart Horizons Career Online Education describes itself as a "private, national online school district". The school district’s core competency is designing, building, and managing affordable, career-based online high schools for students around the world.

Founded in 2010 and located in Ft. Lauderdale, Florida, Smart Horizons Career Online Education develops career-based high school diploma programs. Smart Horizons Career Online Education offers career-credentialed certificates programs for several in-demand careers, such as Child Care, Commercial Driving, Criminal Justice, Office Management, and Homeland Security. All students graduate with both a high school diploma and coursework toward earning a career-credentialed certificate in one of these areas.

Accreditation
Smart Horizons Career Online Education is fully accredited as an online school district by Cognia (formerly AdvancED).

Partnership Programs
Smart Horizons Career Online Education designs, builds, and manages career online high schools for the following types of organizations:
Corporations
Public Libraries
Post-Secondary Schools
Adult & Career Education (K-12)
Prison Education
Dropout Prevention
Workforce & Community-Based Agencies
These partnership programs are designed to develop full-service, branded career online high school programs.

See also
Smart Horizons Career Online High School
Virtual school

References

External links
 Business to Watch (Florida Trend, April 2010)
 New Online High School to offer a second chance to High School dropouts (South Florida Business Journal, December 2009)
 Smart Horizons helps students graduate (Pensacola News Journal, November 2009)
 Web high school targets working adults (Pensacola News Journal, May 2010)

Private schools in Florida
Distance education institutions based in the United States